The Pacific Four Series is an international rugby union competition that is sanctioned by World Rugby. It is contested between four women's national teams — Australia, Canada, New Zealand, and the United States. It began in 2021 and was initially contested between Canada and the United States. They were later joined by Australia and New Zealand in 2022.

History
The Pacific Four Series was announced as a cross-regional tournament that will serve as a qualifier for Oceania Rugby and Rugby Americas North (RAN) to the WXV competition that will officially launch in 2023. Australia, Canada, New Zealand and the United States were announced as the competing teams for the tournament.

Australia and New Zealand were unable to join the inaugural competition in 2021 due to the COVID-19 pandemic. However, World Rugby decided to proceed with the soft launch with only Canada and the United States. Canada won the initial tournament after two rounds of play.

New Zealand won the 2022 Pacific Four Series after defeating the United States 50–6 in the final match.

Results

Team records

See also 

 Women's international rugby - includes all women's international match results

References

Pacific Four Series
Recurring sporting events established in 2021
World Rugby competitions
Australia women's national rugby union team
Canada women's national rugby union team
New Zealand women's national rugby union team
United States women's national rugby union team